Anna Pinnock is a set decorator. She has been nominated six times for an Academy Award for Art Direction or Production Design:

 Gosford Park (2001) – Nominated
 The Golden Compass (2007) – Nominated
 Life of Pi (2012) – Nominated
 The Grand Budapest Hotel (2014) – Winner
 Into the Woods (2014) – Nominated
 Fantastic Beasts and Where to Find Them (2016) – Nominated

Pinnock has worked on three James Bond films: Quantum of Solace, Skyfall, and Spectre.

References

Living people
Best Art Direction Academy Award winners
Best Production Design BAFTA Award winners
Set decorators
Year of birth missing (living people)